Donghak (formerly spelled Tonghak) was an academic movement in Korean Neo-Confucianism founded in 1860 by Choe Je-u. The Donghak movement arose as a reaction to seohak, and called for a return to the "Way of Heaven".  While Donghak originated as a reform movement and revival of Confucian teachings, it gradually evolved into a religion known today as Cheondoism in Korea under the third patriarch Son Byong-hi.

History 

Joseon dynasty, which patronized Neo-Confucianism as the state ideology, saw an increasing polarization between orthodox Confucian scholars and efforts by other Confucian scholars to revive social ethics and reform society. The increasing presence and pressure from the West created a greater sense of urgency among reformers, and thus Choe Je-u first penned his treatise, Comprehensive Book of Eastern Learning, or Dongkyeong Daejeon. This treatise marked the first use of the term "Eastern Learning" and called for a rejection of God (in the Christian sense), and other aspects of Christian theology.

Choe was alarmed by the intrusion of Christianity (Cheonjugyo; Catholicism), and the Anglo-French occupation of Beijing. He believed that the best way to counter foreign influence in Korea was to introduce democracy, establish human rights and create a paradise on Earth independent of foreign interference.

In 1892 the small groups of the Donghak movement were united into a single Peasant Guerrilla Army or Donghak Peasants' Army. The peasants worked in the fields during the day, but during the night, they armed themselves and raided government offices and killed rich landlords (mainly yangban), traders, and foreigners. They confiscated their victims' properties for redistribution.

Choe Je-u was executed as a criminal by the court. The movement was continued by Choe Si-hyeong (1829–1898), who systematized its doctrine. He too was executed.

In 1898, following the execution of Choe Si-hyeong, the leader of Donghak, Son Byong-hi, sought political asylum in contiguous Japan. After the Russo-Japanese War in 1904, he returned to Korea and established the Chinbohoe ("progressive society"), a new cultural and reformist movement designed to reverse the declining fortunes of the nation and to create a new society. Through Donghak he conducted a nationwide movement that aimed at social improvement through the renovation of old customs and ways of life. Hundreds of thousands of members of Donghak cut their long hair short and initiated the wearing of simple, modest clothing. Non-violent demonstrations for social improvement organized by members of Donghak took place throughout 1904. 

Under the third patriarch of the Donghak movement, Son Byeong-hui, the movement became a religion called Cheondogyo, or Cheondoism, which is followed today in both North and South Korea.

Choe Je-u 

Choe Je-u's treatise argued a return to the Confucian understanding of Heaven, with emphasis on self-cultivation and improving one's nature.  As Choe wrote, the Way of Heaven was within one's own mind, and so by improving one's nature, one also attained the Way of Heaven.

Donghak was not accompanied by a specific agenda or systematic doctrine. Choe believed in improvising as events occurred. He had no practical plans or visions of how one would go about establishing a paradise on Earth, let alone what paradise meant except that all people were equal. Nevertheless, Choe's advocacy of democracy, human rights and Korean nationalism struck a chord among the peasant guerrillas and Donghak spread across Korea rapidly. Progressive revolutionaries waded in and organized the peasants into a cohesive fighting unit.

See also
 Cheondoism
 Yongdamjeong
 Donghak Peasant Revolution
 Gapsin Coup
 Jang Il-soon, who built a monument to Dong Hak's second leader, Choi Shi-hyung
 Righteous Army

References 

History of Korea
Religion in Korea
Donghak Peasant Revolution
Cheondoism